Fiasco is a role-playing game by Jason Morningstar, independently published by Bully Pulpit Games. It is marketed as a "GM-less game for 3–5 players, designed to be played in a few hours with six-sided dice and no preparation".  It is billed as "A game of powerful ambition and poor impulse control" and "inspired by cinematic tales of small time capers gone disastrously wrong—films like Blood Simple, Fargo, The Way of the Gun, Burn After Reading, and A Simple Plan." 

Fiasco was the winner of the eleventh Diana Jones Award and has been one of the featured games on Tabletop.

Setting/playsets

Fiasco is designed to simulate the caper-gone-wrong subgenre of film.  It shares creative control of the story among the players, even when determining who each player's character is.  Themes of the game include black comedy, and poor impulse control.

Although there is no one standard setting, each game of Fiasco uses a "playset" that indicates the setting of that specific game. The core rulebook contains playsets for Main Street (small town America), Boomtown (The Wild West), Tales from Suburbia, and The Ice (McMurdo Station, Antarctica).  Bully Pulpit Games also released a free Playset of the Month on their website. These, and many more, are available for free online on the Bully Pulpit Games website,  with many fan-made playsets available online, as well.  The Fiasco Companion provides additional advice on creating playsets.

Each playset consists of a basic description of the setting and:

 six groups of six relationships between two characters in the setting
 six groups of six needs to be shared by two of the characters
 six groups of six notable objects
 six groups of six notable locations

Each group and each element within that group is numbered from one to six.

Gameplay 

Fiasco is a role-playing game with no GM, the game being set up before the action starts.  The game is for three to five players, and takes between one and three hours, including two acts and an aftermath. The things required to play are:

 four ordinary (six sided) dice per player of two different colors
 a Fiasco Playset
 a copy of the Fiasco Tilt Table and the Fiasco Aftermath Table
 pen and paper

Set-up

The players first select the playset and roll dice (four per player—two light, two dark).  The players then go around the table, taking turns to choose a dice. Using the value of the dice, the player selects a group, or an element of a previously selected group, from a list provided by the playset to establish relationships (one for each adjacent player), needs, objects, and locations. Each pair of adjacent players has a defined relationship and one other element (a need, object, or location) that is central to the relationship.  After all dice have been used, they are all returned to a central pool to be used as the game progresses.

After all dice values have been used, each player will share with each neighbor:

 One relationship
 One need, object, or location

The players then discuss who their characters are, what they are called, and how they relate to each other, and the objects, needs, and locations their characters share.  Once this is decided Act One is ready to begin.

Act One

In Act One, for each player's turn, she or he may choose either to Establish or to Resolve.

Should the player choose to Establish, the content of the scene—people, place, conflict—is determined by the player.  Doing this allows the player to set up the scene as they wish.  However, the resolution of the scene or conflict is determined by the other players, who will choose a light die (a good resolution) or a dark die (a bad resolution) to give to the player in the middle of the scene. The player must accept the resolution, acting out or narrating events accordingly.

Alternatively, should the player choose to Resolve, the other players dictate the circumstances of the scene: the characters with whom the player's character will interact, where it happens, and what the conflict within the scene is. Choosing this option gives the player control of the resolution, unlike the Establish option.

In Act One, at the conclusion of a player's scene, she or he selects another player and gives that person the Resolution die.  After each player has had two scenes, half the dice are exhausted and Act One ends.

The Tilt and Act Two

Between Act One and Act Two is the "Tilt"—the incident that is the heart of the story.  To determine who selects the Tilt elements, all players roll their dice (if they have any).  Same-colored die values are added together and the lower total is subtracted from the greater.  The player with the highest total for dark dice and the player with highest total for light dice then roll all unassigned dice.  As when setting up the game, these two players each select one group (such as "Tragedy" or "Failure") on the Tilt Table using the values from the rolled, unassigned dice. Using the remaining die values, the two players choose an element from the other's chosen group ("Death, out of the blue" or "A tiny mistake leads to ruin"), thus establishing the "tilt" element of the story.

After the Tilt has been established, Act Two progresses in the same way as Act One, with each player deciding whether to Establish or Resolve scenes in the same order as Act One.  Typically, the selected Tilt elements will come into play immediately, but this is not always the case.  In some games, the Tilt elements will not show up until the climax of the story, where they will alter the fates of the characters.  Also, along with the new Tilt elements introduced, the biggest difference in Act Two is that instead of giving away the Resolution die, the player keeps it.  If there were mostly positive resolutions in Act One, there will, by necessity, be mostly negative resolutions in Act Two.

The Aftermath

After all the dice are exhausted—each player having had four scenes—everyone rolls the dice they have collected, just like when determining who chooses the Tilt element, and consults the Aftermath table to determine whether their characters has a positive or negative outcome, is dead, or is "worse than dead".

Finally, after a player figures out her or his character's fate, the Aftermath is played out.  Going around the table, each player takes a turn to narrate a short scene, formed into a montage, for their character until all players run out of dice.  At that point, the game is finished.

History and reception

Fiasco started as a game called Hat Creek, about the life and death of a town in the American West, with the relationships created as a part of that game becoming the eventual basis for Fiasco.  The game itself took 14 months to playtest, and used over 70 playtesters in 13 groups.  In November 2008 Jason Morningstar asked for interested playtesters on the story-games forum, and Fiasco was published in December 2009.

Reception was initially very positive in the RPG community, with Fiasco winning one Indie RPG award at GenCon 2010 and being runner up in three other categories. as well as being shortlisted for an Origins Award.  A year later, at GenCon 2011, Fiasco became only the fourth RPG to win the Diana Jones award.

Reviews in the mainstream press have generally been positive; its review, Eurogamer called it "Criminally good fun" and "The funniest game I've ever played". Wired said, "Fiasco is hands down one of the best RPGs I have ever played. ... if you despise collaborative gaming experiences and want very traditional RPG mechanics, Fiasco is going to be a poor fit."  and noted that "Fiasco can easily venture in to areas that may make certain players uncomfortable and so it’s important for people, especially those unfamiliar with each other, to discuss potential limits and taboo subjects before the start of any game."  The Sydney Morning Herald noted that "Clearly, this is not a game for everyone. Players with some experience in improvisation, storytelling, or theatre would get the most enjoyment from it, but many people who have never tried acting or writing before could still have a lot of fun."

Awards
 2009 Indie RPG Awards - Best Support - Winner 
 2010 Golden Geek RPG of the Year Nominee
 2010 Origins Awards Best Roleplaying Game Nominee
 2011 Diana Jones Award for Excellence in Gaming - Winner

The Fiasco Companion

The Fiasco Companion is the first supplement for Fiasco.  It contains advice for playing and hacking Fiasco and contains four playsets and alternative tilt and aftermath tables. It also contains notes and reflections from players of Fiasco including Wil Wheaton and John Rogers.

The Fiasco Companion has won the following awards:

 2011 Indie RPG Awards Supplement of the Year
 2011 Indie RPG Awards Best Support
 2012 Golden Geek Best Supplement

Card-based edition
In August 2019, Bully Pulpit Games introduced a card-based version of the game, which they launched on Kickstarter.  Instead of dice and index cards, the boxed version uses decks of playing cards for playsets and an engine deck.

References

External links 
 Official homepage of the Fiasco role-playing game.
 Fiasco playsets hosted on the publisher's website

Indie role-playing games
Role-playing games introduced in 2009